Swell may refer to:

In nature 
Swell, another name for a geographic hillock
Swell (ocean), a formation of long wavelength ocean surface waves
Swell (geology), a large domed area

Places
Swell, Somerset, a hamlet in the Somerset parish of Fivehead
Swell, Gloucestershire, England

Music
Expression pedal, a control found on many organs and synthesizers, also called a swell box or swell pedal
Swell (band), an indie rock band from San Francisco
Swell, album by Psyched Up Janis
Swell, album by Tiny Moving Parts
Swell Maps, an experimental English rock group of the 1970s

People 
George Gilbert Swell (1923–1999), Indian academic and politician
Steve Swell (born 1954), American musician, composer and educator
Steven Wells (1960–2009), punk poet and journalist known as Swells

Other uses
Swell (bookbinding), a term in bookbinding
Swell (gum), a brand of chewing gum produced by Philadelphia Gum
Swell (exhibit), an art exhibition
Swell, another word for a dandy, fop, or macaroni
Swell, a slang term for "good", "cool", or "nifty"
Swell Radio, a former radio streaming application
S'well, reusable water bottle company

See also
Swelling (disambiguation)
Swelling (medical)
Swell shark, a catshark
Swell Foop, a book by Piers Anthony
Sewell (disambiguation)